Beauclerk or Beauclerc (pronounced boh-clair) is an English surname, from Anglo-Norman meaning "fine scholar". It is also the family name of the Duke of St Albans.

Notable people with the surname include:

Henry I of England (–1135), called "Beauclerc" for his scholarly interests
Lord Amelius Beauclerk (1771–1846), Royal Navy officer
Aubrey Beauclerk (disambiguation)
Beatrix Beauclerk, Duchess of St Albans (1877–1953)
Charles Beauclerk (disambiguation)
Diana Beauclerk, Duchess of St Albans (–1742), British courtier
Lady Diana Beauclerk (1734–1808), English artist
Lord Frederick Beauclerk (1773–1850), Anglican clergyman, President of Marylebone Cricket Club
George Beauclerk (disambiguation)
Lord James Beauclerk (–1787), Anglican clergyman, Bishop of Hereford
Jane Beauclerk, pen-name of M. J. Engh (born 1933), American science fiction author and independent Roman scholar
Marie Bethell Beauclerc (1845–1897), English pioneer of shorthand, reporter and teacher
Murray Beauclerk, 14th Duke of St Albans (born 1939), FCA
Osborne Beauclerk, 12th Duke of St Albans (1874–1964), British Army officer
Ralph Beauclerk, Marqués de Valero de Urría (1917-2007), Captain in the British Army 
Lord Sidney Beauclerk (1703–1744), Member of Parliament and of the British Privy Council, fortune hunter
Topham Beauclerk (1739–1780), English wit, friend of Dr Johnson and Horace Walpole
Vere Beauclerk, 1st Baron Vere (1699–1781), Royal Navy officer and Member of Parliament
William Beauclerk (disambiguation)